La Paloma (La Paloma del Espíritu Santo) is a town in the Canindeyú department of Paraguay.

References

External links
Panoramio.com
Expocanindeyu.xom
Paraguayenfotografias.com

Populated places in the Canindeyú Department